Lake Madison is an unincorporated community and census-designated place in Lake County, South Dakota, United States. Its population was 829 as of the 2020 census. The community is located on the shores of Lake Madison.

Geography
The community is in southeastern Lake County, surrounding Lake Madison. South Dakota Highway 34 forms the northern edge of the CDP. The highway leads west into Madison and east  to Interstate 29.

Lake Madison drains to the southeast, into Round Lake and then Brant Lake, and is part of the Big Sioux River watershed.

Demographics

References

Unincorporated communities in Lake County, South Dakota
Unincorporated communities in South Dakota
Census-designated places in Lake County, South Dakota
Census-designated places in South Dakota